The anterior ethmoidal foramen is a small opening in the ethmoid bone in the skull.

Lateral to either olfactory groove are the internal openings of the anterior and posterior ethmoidal foramina (or canals).

The anterior ethmoidal foramen, situated about the middle of the lateral margin of the olfactory groove, transmits the anterior ethmoidal artery, vein and nerve. 
The anterior ethmoidal nerve, a branch of the nasociliary nerve, runs in a groove along the lateral edge of the cribriform plate to the above-mentioned slit-like opening .

References

External links
  (#5)

Foramina of the skull